Jamf  is a software company best known for developing Jamf Pro (formerly The Casper Suite), a mobile device management system.

History
Minneapolis-based Jamf Software was founded in Eau Claire, Wisconsin, by Zach Halmstad, Christopher Thon and Chip Pearson and in 2002 released The Casper Suite. The company name came from Laszlo Jamf, a character in Thomas Pynchon's novel Gravity's Rainbow. Apple growth in larger environments continued and Jamf developed tools to make Apple devices work in corporate environments. Jamf received a $30 million investment from Summit Partners in 2008.

In 2015 Dean Hager was hired as CEO to replace Halmstad and Pearson, who had previously shared those duties. Over a decade after its inception, The Casper Suite was rebranded as Jamf Pro in 2017.

IBM selected Jamf Pro to manage their Macs in 2015.

Vista Equity Partners acquired a majority of shares in Jamf in December 2017. Jamf acquired three companies in 2018 and 2019 – Orchard and Grove, ZuluDesk and Digita Security, expanding its product portfolio to include identity and authentication management, an education-specific MDM, and endpoint security built for Mac using user behavior analytics. Jamf had a successful IPO on the Nasdaq stock market in July 2020, raising $468 million and valuing the company at around $4.6 billion. In May 2021 Jamf acquired zero-trust software vendor Wandera for $400M.

Products
Unless otherwise noted, all Jamf products support MacOS, iOS, iPadOS, and tvOS.
Jamf Pro (mobile device management)
Jamf Now (mobile device management)
Jamf School (mobile device management): Previously ZuluDesk.
Jamf Teacher
Jamf Connect (identity management)
Jamf Protect (endpoint security)
Jamf Private Access (zero trust security model)
Jamf Data Policy (internet filter and data cap)

Integration with Microsoft Intune
Jamf has a partnership with Microsoft that allows Jamf Pro to communicate with Intune. This partnership extended Microsoft Azure Active Directory and Microsoft Intune to macOS. In 2020, the partnership expanded again to include iOS device compliance.

See also
List of Mobile Device Management software
Unified Endpoint Management
Enterprise Mobility Management
Bring Your Own Device
Mobile Application Management

References

External links

Repository

Mobile device management software
Proprietary software
Software distribution
System administration
Remote administration software
Software companies established in 2002
Software companies based in Minneapolis
2020 initial public offerings
Companies listed on the Nasdaq
2002 establishments in Wisconsin
Companies based in Minneapolis